Edmund Mortimer is the name of:

Members of the Marcher family of Mortimer

Edmund Mortimer, 2nd Baron Mortimer (1251–1304)
Sir Edmund Mortimer (1302–1331) (1300s–1331)
Edmund Mortimer, 3rd Earl of March (1351–1381), and his second son (1352–1381)
Edmund Mortimer, son of the 3rd Earl (1376–1409)
Edmund Mortimer, 5th Earl of March (1391–1425)

Other
Edmund Mortimer (actor) (1874–1944), American actor and film director